= Ralph J. Kaufmann =

American historian

Ralph J. (R.J.) Kaufmann was an American historian of English literature. He was a Stiles Professor Emeritus in Humanities and Comparative Literature, and a widely collected author.
